Gillian Russell-Love (born 28 September 1973 in St. Andrews) is a Jamaican athlete who specializes in the 100 metres hurdles.

Career

In her early career she won four gold medals at the World Junior Championships, which is a record.

Achievements

External links
 
 Picture of Gillian Russell

References

1973 births
Living people
Jamaican female hurdlers
Jamaican female sprinters
Athletes (track and field) at the 1992 Summer Olympics
Athletes (track and field) at the 1996 Summer Olympics
Olympic athletes of Jamaica
Olympic bronze medalists for Jamaica
Pan American Games competitors for Jamaica
Athletes (track and field) at the 1999 Pan American Games
Athletes (track and field) at the 1998 Commonwealth Games
Commonwealth Games medallists in athletics
Medalists at the 1996 Summer Olympics
Olympic bronze medalists in athletics (track and field)
Commonwealth Games gold medallists for Jamaica
Commonwealth Games silver medallists for Jamaica
Goodwill Games medalists in athletics
Central American and Caribbean Games silver medalists for Jamaica
Central American and Caribbean Games bronze medalists for Jamaica
Competitors at the 1998 Central American and Caribbean Games
Central American and Caribbean Games medalists in athletics
Competitors at the 1998 Goodwill Games
20th-century Jamaican women
21st-century Jamaican women
Medallists at the 1998 Commonwealth Games